HMS Cuckmere (K299) was a  of the Royal Navy (RN) in 1943. Cuckmere was originally to be built for the United States Navy, having been laid down as PG-104, but was transferred to the Royal Navy as part of Lend-Lease and finished to the RN's specifications as a Group II River-class frigate. She was first Royal Navy ship to carry the name Cuckmere.

The River class was a class of 151 frigates launched between 1941 and 1944 for use as anti-submarine convoy escorts and were named for rivers in the United Kingdom. The ships were designed by naval engineer William Reed, of Smith's Dock Company of South Bank-on-Tees, to have the endurance and anti-submarine capabilities of the  sloops, while being quick and cheap to build in civil dockyards using the machinery (e.g. reciprocating steam engines instead of turbines) and construction techniques pioneered in the building of the s. Its purpose was to improve on the convoy escort classes in service with the Royal Navy at the time, including the Flower class.

In October 1943, Cuckmere served as an escort for Operation Torch. In November and December, she served convoy defence in the Western Mediterranean.

She was towed to Algiers and subsequently declared a constructive total loss.

She remained at Algiers until after the end of World War II when she then received repairs at Cantieri Navali, Taranto. She returned to US Navy custody 6 November 1946 and was stationed in Brooklyn, New York. In May 1948, she was transferred to the War Shipping Administration and scrapped.

References

External links 
 
 

 

1942 ships
River-class frigates of the Royal Navy
Ships built in Canada